Saaravita is a 1965 Sri Lankan Sinhala comedy thriller film directed by Tissa Liyanasuriya and produced by Shesha Palihakkara for Serendib Films. It stars Joe Abeywickrama in lead role along with Wally Nanayakkara, Thilakasiri Fernando and Jeevarani Kurukulasuriya. Music composed by W. D. Amaradeva. It is the 126th Sri Lankan film in the Sinhala cinema.

Saravita won the award for the Best film at the 1966 Sarasaviya Awards. Also, Tissa Liyanasuriya won Sarasaviya awards for Best Director, Joe Abeywickrema won Best Actor award and Nanda Malini won Best Songstress that year.

Plot

Cast
 Joe Abeywickrama as Bamunusinghe Arachilage Gunahamy 'Saraiyya'
 Jessica Wickramasinghe as Maggie Akka
 Wally Nanayakkara as Jayathunga Arachige Marcus 'Marcus Aiyya'
 Thilakasiri Fernando as Pahul 'Unnahe'
 Piyadasa Gunasekera as Jackie
 Jeevarani Kurukulasuriya as Imara Ganegoda
 Sunila Jayanthi as Neranjana
 Sobani Amarasinghe as Devika
 Bandu Munasinghe as Somey
 Somi Meegama as Imara's Amma
 D. M. Colombage as Social service worker
 B. S. Perera as Muslim Mudalali
 Don Sirisena as Muslim Mudalali's co-worker
 M. A. Simiyon as Robbed Mudalali
 Martin Gunadasa
 S. P. Liyanage as Pappa Mahaththaya

References

External links
 සාරවිට චිත්‍රපටය (Saravita Movie) – 1965

1965 films
1960s Sinhala-language films
Films set in Sri Lanka (1948–present)